The Ljuboten Incident, also referred to by Macedonians as the Ljubotenski Bacila massacre, happened on 10 August, 2001, when an Macedonian Army truck convoy composed of reservists ran over a landmine near the village of Ljuboten killing 8 men. Right after the attack fighting between Albanian rebels and Macedonian forces erupted. The Macedonian government officially blamed the NLA for the Attack, although the leader of the NLA, Ali Ahmeti, didn't confirm NLA involvement in planting the mines and suggested the devices might have been placed by government forces to prevent rebel crossings, and expressed regret at the incident.

Aftermath 
Two days after the attack, Macedonian forces surrounded Ljuboten and massacred 10 Albanian civilians.

References 

2001 insurgency in Macedonia
Attacks in 2001
Ambushes in Europe
Massacres in North Macedonia
August 2001 events in Europe